John Myles (21 June 1813 – 12 July 1893) was a politician in colonial Victoria (Australia), a member of the Victorian Legislative Council and later, the Victorian Legislative Assembly.

Myles was born in Limerick, Ireland, and with his brother, George Myles came out to Sydney c.1839.
Henry Parfitt, M.L.A., was a passenger in the same vessel. 
After staying a few months in Sydney the two brothers went to New Zealand, and settled at Kororareka – a town on the Bay of Islands, and one of the earliest British settlements in New Zealand. The country was very mountainous, the climate wet, and the life very rough, and they removed to what was then known as the Port Phillip District of New South Wales. After a short stay in Melbourne they finally decided to settle down at Geelong. They built a store, and commenced business in Corio street, which was then the principal business street of the little town. After several years, as the town extended, they built new premises at the corner of Moorabool and Ryrie streets, known for many years after as Myles's corner. Then the rush to the gold diggings at Ballarat took place, and Geelong was deserted by nearly all its male population The two brothers went too, but were unsuccessful. John Myles sold out his business, and invested his means in the building of a number of shops and houses in Geelong. He took an active part in the early constitutional struggles, and in every movement for the advancement of the colony and of the district in which he lived.

Myles was a member of the Victorian Legislative Council for Grant from December 1852 until the original Council was abolished in March 1856. 
Myles was a member of the Victorian Legislative Assembly for the Electoral district of South Grant from November 1856 to July 1861.

Myles died in Durham Ox, Victoria on 12 July 1893.

References

1813 births
1893 deaths
Members of the Victorian Legislative Council
Members of the Victorian Legislative Assembly
Irish emigrants to Australia
19th-century Australian politicians